Diana Arismendi (born November 8, 1962) is a Venezuelan composer.

Life
A government scholarship afforded her the opportunity to travel to Paris for further study, and in 1982 she began lessons under Jacques Castérède and Yoshisha Taira at the  École Normale de Musique de Paris; she graduated from the institution in 1986. Another scholarship, this one from OEA, allowed her to attend the Catholic University of America, from which she received a master's degree in 1992 and a doctorate two years later. Arismendi has worked in various forms, including opera, and has composed a number of works for orchestra as well as chamber pieces, piano works, and choral music. She has also worked with electroacoustic media.

References

1962 births
Living people
Musicians from Caracas
Venezuelan women classical composers
Venezuelan classical composers
20th-century classical composers
21st-century classical composers
École Normale de Musique de Paris alumni
Catholic University of America alumni
20th-century women composers
21st-century women composers